Arseo Island is a small uninhabited island in Malampa Province of Vanuatu in the Pacific Ocean. There are two small neighboring islands: Leumanang and Varo.

Population
As of 1999, the official local population was 290. However, as of 2009, the island was fully depopulated.

References

Islands of Vanuatu
Malampa Province